Amucallia colombiana is a species of beetle in the family Cerambycidae. It was described by Galileo and Martins in 2010. It is known from Colombia.

References

Calliini
Beetles described in 2010